Hsu Yu-hsiou and Benjamin Lock were the defending champions and successfully defended their title, defeating Oleksii Krutykh and Grigoriy Lomakin 6–3, 6–4 in the final.

Seeds

Draw

References

External links
 Main draw

President's Cup II - Doubles